Eric Van Lustbader (born December 24, 1946) is an American author of thriller and fantasy novels. He has published as Eric Lustbader, Eric V. Lustbader, and Eric Van Lustbader.

He is a graduate of New York's Stuyvesant High School and Columbia College, with a degree in sociology, and he has a second-level Reiki degree. He is married to Victoria Lustbader (née Schochet), who is also an author, as well as an editor.

Biography

Lustbader was born and raised in Greenwich Village, where he developed interests in art and writing. He lived downstairs from actress Lauren Bacall, and built orange-crate racers in Washington Square Park with actors Keith and David Carradine. He is a graduate of Columbia College, with a degree in sociology.

Before turning to writing full-time, he was employed by the New York City public school system, where he holds licenses in both elementary and early childhood education, and in the music business, where he worked for Elektra Records and CBS Records. Writing for Cashbox magazine, he also covered such acts as Elton John, Santana, Roxy Music, the Jimi Hendrix Experience, David Bowie, and The Who. Lustbader became friends with Elton John and his lyricist, Bernie Taupin, as the first American journalist to predict John would be a huge star, in his column in Cashbox. He went out on tour with John, including the dates at the Fillmore East, Carnegie Hall, and Madison Square Garden in November 1974 when John Lennon guest starred on the third night of the four nights. Several years later, while working for Dick James Music, he wrote and field produced a segment on John for John Chancellor's NBC Nightly News, the first such segment on an entertainer.

Bibliography

The Pearl Saga

The Ring of Five Dragons (2001)
The Veil of a Thousand Tears (2002)
The Cage of Nine Banestones (2004) (US title: Mistress of the Pearl)

The Testament Novels 
 The Testament (2006)
 The Fallen (2017)
Four Dominions (2018)
The Sum of All Shadows (2019)

The Sunset Warrior Cycle
The Sunset Warrior (1977)
Shallows of Night (1978)
Dai-San (1978)
Beneath an Opal Moon (1980)
Dragons on the Sea of Night (1997)

The China Maroc Series
Jian (1986)
Shan (1988)

The Nicholas Linnear/Ninja Cycle
 The Ninja (1980)
 The Miko (1984)
 White Ninja (1990)
 The Kaisho (1993)
 Floating City (1994)
 Second Skin (1995)
 The Death and Life of Nicholas Linnear (2014) e-book short story
 The Oligarch's Daughter (2016) e-book short story

The Jack McClure / Alli Carson Series
 First Daughter (2008)
 Last Snow (2010)
 Blood Trust (2011)
 Father Night (2012)
 Beloved Enemy (2013)

The Evan Ryder Series 
 The Nemesis Manifesto (2020)
 The Kobalt Dossier (2021)
 Omega Rules (2022)

Continuation of The Bourne Series of Robert Ludlum
With permission from the estate of Robert Ludlum, Lustbader continued writing Jason Bourne novels from where Ludlum left off in The Bourne Ultimatum until 2018, when he left the series.
 The Bourne Legacy (2004)
 The Bourne Betrayal (2007)
 The Bourne Sanction (2008)
 The Bourne Deception (2009)
 The Bourne Objective (2010)
 The Bourne Dominion (2011)
 The Bourne Imperative (2012)
 The Bourne Retribution (2013)
 The Bourne Ascendancy (2014)
 The Bourne Enigma (2016)
 The Bourne Initiative (2017)

Others
 Sirens (1981)
 Black Heart (1983)
 Zero (1987)
 French Kiss (1989)
 Angel Eyes (1991)
 Black Blade (1993)
 Batman: The Last Angel (1994) DC Comics graphic novel
 Dark Homecoming (1997)
 Pale Saint (1999)
 Art Kills (2002)
 Any Minute Now (2016)

Anthologies containing stories by Eric Van Lustbader
 David Copperfield's Beyond Imagination (1982)
 Peter S Beagle's Immortal Unicorn (1984)
 Raymond Chandler's Philip Marlowe: A Centennial Celebration (1988)
 David Copperfield's Tales of the Impossible (1995)
 Excalibur (1995)
 Murder by Revenge (1996)
 Vampires (1997)
 999 (1999)
Thriller (2006)
 Women of the Night (2007)

Short stories
 "In Darkness, Angels" (1983)
 "The Devil on Myrtle Ave" (1995)
 "Lassorio" (1995)
 "The Singing Tree" (1995)
 "16 Mins." (1996)
 "An Exaltation of Termagants" (1999)

References
Author information at Books 'n' Bytes
Profile at Bookreporter.com

External links
 
 
  
Eric Van Lustbader at Internet Book List

Eric Van Lustbader on Goodreads.com
BlogTalkRadio - Modern Signed Books interview with Rodger Nichols Aug. 25, 2016

1946 births
20th-century American journalists
20th-century American male writers
20th-century American non-fiction writers
20th-century American novelists
20th-century American short story writers
21st-century American male writers
21st-century American novelists
21st-century American short story writers
American fantasy writers
American graphic novelists
American horror writers
American male non-fiction writers
American male novelists
American male short story writers
American music journalists
American science fiction writers
American spy fiction writers
American thriller writers
Columbia College (New York) alumni
Dark fantasy writers
Living people
Novelists from New York (state)
People from Greenwich Village
Reiki practitioners
Stuyvesant High School alumni
Weird fiction writers
Writers from Manhattan
Writers of Gothic fiction
Writers of historical mysteries